This is a list of bridges and tunnels on the National Register of Historic Places in the U.S. state of Vermont.

See also
List of covered bridges in Vermont
List of non-authentic covered bridges in Vermont

References

 
Vermont
Bridges
Bridges, NRHP